The 29th Senate District of Wisconsin is one of 33 districts in the Wisconsin State Senate.  Located in north-central Wisconsin, the district comprises all of Rusk, and Taylor counties, along with most of Sawyer and Marathon counties, and parts of northwest Clark County and northern Wood County.  The district includes the city of Wausau and part of the city of Marshfield, but is otherwise very rural.

Current elected officials
Cory Tomczyk is the senator representing the 29th district since January 2023.

Each Wisconsin State Senate district is composed of three Wisconsin State Assembly districts.  The 29th Senate district comprises the 85th, 86th, and 87th Assembly districts.  The current representatives of those districts are:
 Assembly District 85: Patrick Snyder (R–Schofield)
 Assembly District 86: John Spiros (R–Marshfield)
 Assembly District 87: James W. Edming (R–Glen Flora)

The district is located entirely within Wisconsin's 7th congressional district, which is represented by U.S. Representative Tom Tiffany.

Past senators
Previous senators include:

Note: the boundaries of districts have changed repeatedly over history. Previous politicians of a specific numbered district have represented a completely different geographic area, due to redistricting.

References

External links
District Website
Senator Petrowski Website

Wisconsin State Senate districts
Marathon County, Wisconsin
Barron County, Wisconsin
Bayfield County, Wisconsin
Price County, Wisconsin
Rusk County, Wisconsin
Taylor County, Wisconsin
1856 establishments in Wisconsin